Srihari Bholekar (1 January 1941 – 23 August 2018) was a painter, sculptor and printmaker from Telangana, India.

Early life
Bholekar was born in Bollakpalli. He obtained his diploma in drawing and painting from the Sir J.J. School of Art, Mumbai, completed Diploma in Painting in 1961 and since then continued painting, winning several awards, participating several state and national exhibitions, and organising art activities. He was also a graduate from Osmania University.

He participated in several group and one-man shows in Portugal, Italy, Macedonia, Poland, Germany, New Delhi, Chandigarh, Kolkata, Mumbai, Bangalore Chennai, Bhopal, Ahmedabad, Lucknow, Amritsar, Raipur, Baroda and took part in Art Conference National Academy of Fine Arts, International Arts Conference Lalit Kala Academy 3rd Triennale, New Delhi World Telugu Conference and Artiste Conference A.P. State Lalit Kala Academy Hyderabad.

Bholekar came from a small village called Bollakpalli, on the banks of river Manjeera which is 5 kilometers away from Banswada in the Kamareddy district of Telangana State in India. He belonged to the Patlolla family where he was also known as Patlolla Srihari. He got his name Bholekar when it was recorded by Marathi-based institutions where he initially studied. This is due to the practice of the people of Maharashtra of adding the '-Kar' suffix to one's village/community and keeping it as a surname.

As he was born and brought up in Telangana in India he set his paintings of rural life in a modern style by powerful imageries with an unusual and unique background setup. Most of his subjects portray not only the life of Telangana and its culture, customs, traditions, difficulties, plights, misfortunes and predicaments but also abstracts and international level art-works.

The Art of Bholekar brings the significant emotional, cultural and cognitive evaluations of nature of life.'

Bholekar died on August 23, 2018.

Career and style
He worked as the Chief Artist at Indian Air Force at Begumpet and in 1996 he was honoured with Commendation by A.O.C – in – C.H.Q.T.C Indian Air Force,

Bholekar attributed his free-spirited nature to the village life he grew up in. “Till 10 years I enjoyed the village life. Art has not developed because of it but its influence is still there. The energy, the process and boldness in my works comes from village atmosphere. I had come through so many situations in early life; not hardships, but I enjoyed my life as a child. My parents did not allow me to go and play in the jungle”.

A specialist in mural paintings, Bholekar has the distinction of holding the first contemporary one-man show in Salar Jung Museum in 1963. “I was just 21 and had exhibited my works,” . The exhibits made the art lovers sit up and take notice of the young artist. “The modern paintings were bold and not decorative. The theme was my village and my imagination of the village,” 

His works travelled far and wide and made a name for him in the international arena. He also worked as a chief artist in Begumpet airport and worked vigorously in the world of art for 18 years before walking away from it. “I stopped everything and wanted to be a simple man without any artistic attachments,” he said, "Was it easy to stay away from art? “I have a strong will power. I stopped drinking and smoking at the age of 35 because of willpower. I am born with art instinct and returned to printmaking”.

Bholekar's art encompasses many different media. After making a mark in print media, he gravitated to ink drawings. “Here artists do not interact much with artists of other countries. Their works are simple as they do not experiment. Their subject is same and as a result, they get stagnated. I don’t want to be like that”, “My drawings will continue for some time and then I will shift to another media.”

“One can enjoy the design sense and interpret the work in one’s own way. My abstract drawing is like music. One need not know the intricacies of laya and raga but its rhythm is appreciated. Likewise, art lovers can enjoy the rhythmic lines and its composition and it is aesthetic too”.

Awards

 2004 National Award - Govt. of India - Lalit Kala Akademi
2005-07 Senior Fellowship Visual Art Graphics, Government of India, Ministry of Culture, New Delhi
2003 Honoured as one of the Veteran Artist of India, New Delhi
1996 Honoured with Commendation by A.O.C - in – C.H.Q.T.C Indian Air Force
1988 Gold Medal All India Exhibition, Maha Koshal Kala Parishath, Raipur
1988 Honoured as Eminent Artist by Maharastra Mandal (A.P), Hyderabad
1977 Gold Medal All India Exhibition Hyderabad Art Society

Exhibitions
Solo Exhibitions

2000 An Exhibition at Jehangir Art Gallery, Mumbai.

1977 The Graphics Prints Exhibition Organised by Alliance Franchise, Bangalore

1973 Mural Paintings at Kala Bhavan, Hyderabad

1968 Exhibition of Paintings at Kala Bhavan, Hyderabad

1966 Hyderabad Art Society

1965 Ravindra Bharathi

1964 Ajantha Pavilion Public Gardens, Hyderabad

Group Exhibitions

1966, 69, 78, 85, 86 and 2004 National Exhibition of Art, Lalitha Academy (Painting, Sculpture & Graphics), New Delhi

1974, 76, 85, 2004 Academy of Fine Arts, Kolkata

1985 Arts Society of India, Mumbai

Karnataka Chitrakala Parishad, Bangalore

Bombay Art Society, Mumbai

References

External links

Indian male painters
2018 deaths
Osmania University alumni
People from Nizamabad district
1941 births
20th-century Indian painters
Painters from Telangana
20th-century Indian male artists